= Göppinger Theatertage =

Theatre festival in Germany

Göppinger Theatertage is a theatre festival in Germany.
